is the debut album by Japanese singer-songwriter Yōsui Inoue, released in May 1972.

Backing tracks of the album were mainly played by the instrumentalists of The Mops, and they were arranged by the group's guitarist Katz Hoshi. Hoshi continued working as an arranger for most of Inoue's studio albums released in later years.

Prior to the album, "Jinsei ga Nido Areba" came out as a single (B-Side was the album's title track which features his aggressive vocals that homage Paul and Linda McCartney's song "Monkberry Moon Delight"). Danzetsu is best known by "Kasa ga Nai" which was released as the second single from the album. It became one of his signature songs, and later recorded by multiple artists like Off Course, Kazuyoshi Saito, UA, Mucc, and Akina Nakamori. Bank Band, the charity project formed by Mr. Children's frontman Kazutoshi Sakurai and his musical collaborator Takeshi Kobayashi, interpreted the song "Kagirinai Yokubō" on their album 'Soushi Souai released in 2004.

Because of his breakthrough in the following year, Danzetsu enjoyed long-term commercial success on the Japanese Oricon charts during the mid-1970s, entering there for over three years.

Track listing
All songs written and composed by Yōsui Inoue, arranged by Katz Hoshi

Side one
"" – 4:00
"" – 3:57
"" – 2:30
"" – 3:09
"" – 3:27
"" – 5:00

Side two
"" – 2:44
"" – 2:27
"" – 3:33
"" – 4:24
"" – 2:42
"" – 5:31

Personnel
Yosui Inoue – folk guitar, vocals
Takao Kisugi – folk guitar
Shigeru Hara – folk guitar
Katz Hoshi – folk and Electric guitars
Taro Miyuki – bass guitar
Jun Fukamachi – piano, Hammond organ
Johnny Yamazaki – electric Piano
Mikiharu Suzuki – drums

Chart positions

Album

Single

Release history

References

1972 albums
Yōsui Inoue albums